Raoul le Bon (Ralph the Good)' (d. 4 January 1235), also known as Raoul III de Nesle''', was the Count of Soissons from 1180. He was the third son of Raoul II de Nesle and Gertrude de Montaigu.

In 1178 Raoul and his elder brother John subscribed to a charter of the eldest brother, Conon, then count, donating property to Notre-Dame d'Ourscamp. When Alberic de Trois-Fontaines wrote his chronicle, he could refer to count Raoul of Soissons qui adhuc vivit'' (who still lives). But he later records his death in 1235. In 1184 Ralph became castellan of Noyon. According to Rigord, he took the Cross alongside Henry II of England and Philip II of France at a ceremony between Trie and Gisors on 13 Jan 1188 and joined the Third Crusade.

Raoul was the fourth husband of Adèle of Dreux (b. 1145/1146), daughter of Robert I of Dreux. Raoul was briefly married to Yolande, daughter of Geoffrey IV of Joinville, before taking as his third wife Ada d'Avesnes, widow of Henry, Count of Grandpré.

Raoul and his first wife Adele he had: 
 Gertrude, married first to Count Jean de Beaumont-sur-Oise (d. 1222), and second to Mathieu II de Montmorency (d.1230), Constable of France.
 Alienor, married first to Count Mathieu III de Beaumont-sur-Oise (d. 1208), and second to Étienne II de Sancerre (d. 1252), Grand Butler of France and son of Stephen I, Count of Sancerre.

By his third wife Ada he had three children: 
 John, Count of Soissons
 Ralph (d. 1272), who was probably a trouvère (troubadour)
 Isabelle of Nesle, married to a Viscount of Châtellerault.
Upon the death of Raoul, his son John became Count of Soissons.

References

Sources

External links
Nobility of the Paris region: Chapter 9. Comtes de Soissons, Part C. Nesle at the Medieval Lands Project.

1235 deaths
Counts of Soissons
Year of birth unknown
12th-century French people
13th-century French people
Christians of the Third Crusade